Darreh Doran Rural District is a rural district (dehestan) in the Central District of Rafsanjan County, Kerman Province, Iran. At the 2006 census, its population was 2,493, in 695 families. The rural district has 10 villages.

References 

Rural Districts of Kerman Province
Rafsanjan County